Hendecasis fumilauta is a moth in the family Crambidae. It is found in India (Meghalaya).

References

Cybalomiinae
Moths described in 1896